Viva Cangaceiro  (originally titled as O' Cangaçeiro, also known as The Magnificent Bandits) is a Brazilian themed Spaghetti Western-like movie co-produced by Spain and Italy and directed by Giovanni Fago.

Plot
Espedito is the sole survivor of his hometown after it got annihilated by Colonel Minas and his death squad for harbouring an infamous cangaceiro. A hermit consoles him by planting the idea in his mind that he was from now on chosen to fight injustice. Espedito tries to live up to this vision.

Cast 
 Tomas Milian: Espedito
 Ugo Pagliai: Vincenzo
 Eduardo Fajardo: Gov. Branco
 Leo Anchóriz: Army Officer
 Howard Ross: Hoffmann
 Claudio Scarchilli

Reception 
The movie received mixed reviews and is generally considered a minor variant of the similar movies Tomas Milian has starred in for Sergio Sollima (Face to Face and Run, Man, Run!), Sergio Corbucci (The Mercenary and Compañeros) and Giulio Petroni (Tepepa).
Simon Gelton (aka "Scherpschutter") wrote for spaghetti-western.net considered Riz Ortolani's film score unique and praised Alejandro Ulloa's pictures of Bahia. Yet he didn't "recommend the film wholeheartedly" because due to a lack of "emotional depth" Viva Cangaceiro would never "really take off". He stated the plot was occasionally  at the brink of being "absurd".

See also 
 O Cangaceiro (1953)

References

External links

1970 films
Spaghetti Western films
Spanish Western (genre) films
1970 Western (genre) films
Films set in Brazil
Films scored by Riz Ortolani
Films directed by Giovanni Fago
1970s Italian films
1970s Spanish films